was a town located in Sōraku District, Kyoto Prefecture, Japan.

As of February 1, 2007, the town had an estimated population of 15,907 and a density of 430.27 persons per km². The total area was 36.97 km².

On March 12, 2007, Kamo, along with the towns of Kizu and Yamashiro (all from Sōraku District), was merged to create the city of Kizugawa.

Between the years of 740 to 744, Kamo had been the capital of Japan named Kuni-kyō.

External links
Kamo official website in Japanese

 Kamo Planetarium

Dissolved municipalities of Kyoto Prefecture